The ice hockey team rosters at the 1964 Winter Olympics consisted of the following players:

Austria
Head coach:  Zdenek Ujcik

Canada
Head coach: David Bauer

Czechoslovakia
Head coach: Jiří Anton

Finland
Head coach:  Viljo Wirkkunen

Assistant coach: Risto Lindroos

Germany
Head coach: Markus Egen

Assistant coach: Engelbert Holderied

Hungary
Head coach:  Vladimir Kominek

Italy
Head coach:  Slavomír Bartoň

Japan
Head coach: Niuro Hoshino

Norway
Head coach: Rolf Kirkvaag

Poland
Head coach:  Gary Hughes

Romania
Head coaches: Mihai Flamaropol,  Ladislav Horský

Soviet Union
Head coach: Arkadi Chernyshyev

Assistant coach: Anatoly Tarasov

Sweden

Switzerland
Head coach:  Hervé Lalonde

United States
Head coach: Walter Bush

Yugoslavia
Head coach:  Vaclav Bubník

References

Sources

Hockey Hall Of Fame page on the 1964 Olympics 

rosters
1964